Bela Nagy (born December 18, 1957) is a former Romanian ice hockey player. He played for the Romania men's national ice hockey team at the 1980 Winter Olympics in Lake Placid.

References

1957 births
Living people
Ice hockey players at the 1980 Winter Olympics
Olympic ice hockey players of Romania
Sportspeople from Miercurea Ciuc
Romanian ice hockey right wingers
Romanian sportspeople of Hungarian descent